Rubén Galván may refer to:

 Rubén Galván (footballer) (1952–2018), Argentine football midfielder
 Rubén Galván (boxer) (born 1972), Mexican American boxer